"Big Mouth" is a song by Canadian musician Nikki Yanofsky. The song was released on September 14, 2018 as a single from Nikki's upcoming album, Big Mouth. Nikki Yanofsky teased for a music video for the song on her Instagram, that contained a tribute to the talented jazz musician, Aretha Franklin. She recorded the music video for the song before Aretha Franklin's death. The song was accidentally leaked on Nikki's management website for two days on August 22 and 23 until it was taken down.

Composition 
Nikki announced on her Twitter that the song was inspired by the 2017 Women's March.

Release 
Yanofsky announced that she had a new song coming out on her Twitter on January 20, 2018. On September 7, 2018 Yanofsky unveiled the single art for the song, which depicts her wearing large Octangular glasses and a gold chain with her name on it. The song was released in French and English on September 14, 2018.

Music video 
A music video for the song was released on Vevo on September 25, 2018. The video was directed by Emma Higgins. The song currently has over 100,000 views.

Track listing

Chart performance 
The song peaked at number 40 on the Canada AC chart, and was on the chart for 18 weeks.

Charts

References 

Nikki Yanofsky songs
2018 songs
2018 singles
French songs